Viridistria thoracica is a moth of the family Noctuidae first described by Frederic Moore in 1882. It is found in northern India.

References

Pantheinae
Moths of Asia